Forward/Return is an EP release by The Album Leaf, available as of September 18, 2012.

Track listing

References

2012 EPs
The Album Leaf albums